Tom Savage (born 24 April 1989) is an English professional rugby union player who plays for Suntory Sungoliath. Tom Savage signed a three-year contract extension with Gloucester until end of 2015/16 season. His regular playing positions are Lock and Flanker.

Savage was named new club captain for Gloucester Rugby from Director of Rugby Nigel Davies for the 2013–14 season.

On 5 April 2019, Savage left Gloucester after eight seasons with his home club to play with Suntory Sungoliath in Japan's Top League competition.

External links
Gloucester Rugby profile

References

1989 births
Living people
English rugby union players
Gloucester Rugby players
Rugby union players from London Borough of Havering
Tokyo Sungoliath players
Rugby union locks
Rugby union flankers